James Oldfield (born in October 1981 in Ipswich, UK) is an English bass-baritone. In 2008 he was awarded a Sybil Tutton Award from the Musicians Benevolent Fund, and in 2010 he was given the Leonard Ingrams Award from Garsington Opera.

Biography 
James Oldfield was a chorister at Leicester Cathedral whilst a pupil at Leicester Grammar School. He then became a choral scholar at Trinity College, Cambridge under Dr Richard Marlow, where he read Geography. From 2006-2009 he studied at the Royal College of Music, including two years in the Benjamin Britten International Opera School. He studied singing with countertenor Ashley Stafford.

Oldfield made his international debut singing Handel's Messiah in the Dublin Handel Festival, and his operatic debut in Purcell's The Fairy Queen with the Retrospect Ensemble, conducted by Matthew Halls. In 2010 he made his UK operatic debut as Figaro in Le nozze di Figaro for Garsington Opera. In November 2010 he sang the role of Nick Shadow in The Rake's Progress for Gothenburg Opera, followed by his debut with the Royal Opera House as Ludd in Ludd and Isis by Stephen Taylor.

He has performed in the Royal Festival Hall, the Royal Albert Hall, the Barbican, St John's Smith Square, Birmingham Symphony Hall, Bridgewater Hall and the Wigmore Hall. Oldfield has appeared as a soloist with the Hallé, Royal Philharmonic Orchestra, London Symphony Orchestra,

Operatic repertoire
 
Zuniga in Carmen by Bizet
Bottom in A Midsummer Night's Dream by Britten
Noye in Noye's Fludde by Britten
Swallow in Peter Grimes by Britten
Collatinus in The Rape of Lucretia by Britten
Polyphemus in Acis and Galatea by Handel
Clito in Alessandro by Handel
Achilla in Giulio Cesare  by Handel
Ormonte in Partenope by Handel
Forester in The Cunning Little Vixen by Janáček
Seneca in L'incoronazione di Poppea by Monteverdi
Alfonso in Così fan tutte by Mozart
Sarastro in The Magic Flute by Mozart
Figaro in The Marriage of Figaro by Mozart
Aeneas in Dido and Aeneas by Purcell
All the bass roles in The Fairy Queen by Purcell
Bruschino padre in Il Signor Bruschino by Rossini
Nick Shadow in The Rake's Progress by Stravinsky
Gremin in Yevgeny Onegin by Tchaikovsky

Concert repertoire
Oldfield has performed most of the standard concert repertoire for basses and baritones. He is well known for his interpretations of the requiems of Brahms, Mozart, Fauré, Duruflé and Saint-Saëns, the passions of J.S. Bach, and oratorios by Handel. Oldfield also regularly performs Orff's Carmina Burana, Elgar's Dream of Gerontius, Rossini's Petite Messe Solennelle and Puccini's Messa di Gloria.

Discography
Oldfield has recorded Monteverdi's Vespers of 1610 for Signum Records, James Macmillan's Seven Last Words from the Cross for Naxos, and Handel's Messiah. The latter was recorded live with the Huddersfield Choral Society, with Oldfield having taken the part on extremely short notice.

References

1981 births
Living people
Musicians from Ipswich
People educated at Leicester Grammar School
Operatic bass-baritones
English male singers
English opera singers
21st-century English singers
21st-century British male singers